Pha Taem National Park (Thai:อุทยานแห่งชาติผาแต้ม) is a national park on the Mekong River in Ubon Ratchathani Province, northeast Thailand. Phou Xieng Thong National Protected Area in Laos is on the opposite side of the river.

It is notable for its Dipterocarp forest cover and for extensive rock art on cliffs above the Mekong. The art is estimated to be 3,000 years old. The park also has several examples of mushroom rocks as well as the largest flower field in Thailand.

Pha Taem National Park is a popular destination for the first sunshine of the New Year to fall on Thailand.

Pha Taem National Park was declared a national park on 31 December 1991, with an area of 212,500 rai ~ .

History 
In the past, only a few local peasants from the surrounding region dared to access the Pha Taem area.  Because it is believed that Pha Taem is a prohibited location, and the mountain is protected by the holy. Pha Taem is renowned as the "Mountain of Death," and anybody who trespasses risks becoming ill or, worse, dying. The Pha Taem region has been widely publicized. Following that, professors and students from Silpakorn University Department of Archaeology researched and uncovered prehistoric ancient paintings 3,000-4,000 years old at Pha Taem, Ban Kum, Huai Phai sub-district, Khong Chiam district, Ubon Ratchathani province. In the original dialect, "Taem" refers to a drawing, painting, stamping, or any other action that uses color to create images, marks, or symbols. It is the site of prehistoric paintings dating from 3,000 to 4,000 years old, divided into four groups, the longest of which is 180 meters long and contains over 300 images. Furthermore, Pha Taem is surrounded by densely packed trees. As a consequence, they began to draft a memorandum from the department dated May 26, 1981 and requested to the Royal Forest Department that the forest and mountain in the Pha Taem zone be designated as a national park. It was designated as the 74th national park of Thailand. Pha Taem National Park is approximately 340 square kilometers in size. The district of Khong Chiam encompasses the area. Ubon Ratchathani Province's Si Mueang Mai District and Pho Sai District have fertile forest conditions. a variety of wild animals There are numerous natural beauty features in the area, including Pha Chan, Soi Sawan Waterfall, Sao Chaliang, Tham Patihan, Phu Na Tham, and others. There have also been discoveries of ancient paintings. Prehistoric times, approximately 3,000-4,000 years old, in the Pha Kham, Pha Taem, Pha Chek, and Pha Moei areas, and currently a national park. It is designated as a national park with the Mekong River, which forms the border between Thailand and Laos, is the longest national park boundary in Thailand. allowing for a view of the forest on the Laos side.

Flora and fauna
The park is covered by Dipterocarp forest with Shorea obtusa, Shorea siamensis, and Dipterocarpus obtusifollus the dominant species. There are some dry evergreen forests near streams.

The park is habitat for Siamese hares, barking deer, civets, and wild pigs and serow, which migrate from Laos in summer. In 2005, specimens of a new frog species, Fejervarya triora, were discovered in the park.
The park's habitat also includes wild elephants that migrate to areas of Ubonrachathani Province from Laos during February and March in search of food, especially banana leaves and fruit. Source: Thai farmers located west of the Mekong River near Bunthalik (sic), Ubon Province.

Gallery

See also
List of national parks of Thailand
List of Protected Areas Regional Offices of Thailand

References

External links
 Travelfish: Pha Taem National Park

National parks of Thailand
Geography of Ubon Ratchathani province
Tourist attractions in Ubon Ratchathani province
Protected areas established in 1991
1991 establishments in Thailand